The Doctor of Commerce (DCom) is a doctoral degree in commerce-, accounting-, mathematics-, economics-, and management-related subjects, awarded by universities in the Commonwealth. The degree is offered both as a higher doctorate, and as a research doctorate.

The higher doctorate
is awarded for published work of the candidate, demonstrating original contributions of "special excellence" in some branch of commerce. The candidate will be a graduate of the university in question.

The research doctorate is largely comparable to a PhD;
in fact "Doctor of Commerce" may refer to a commerce-related PhD. 
At some universities, relatedly,  the degree-title conferred will be a function of the candidate’s background: for example, in operations research, the degree may be a PhD or a DCom, depending on whether the candidate held a Master of Science or Master of Commerce respectively. 
Further, in some cases, the degree title may also depend on the area of the research: a thesis focused on a more theoretical area (e.g. "finance") will be awarded a PhD, while one focused on a specific area or function (e.g. financial management) will be awarded a DCom.  
Finally, in some cases the distinction will be whether the degree includes coursework or is entirely thesis based.

The research doctorate is usually accessed following a related master's degree, often the Master of Commerce.  Here, there is generally a requirement that the master’s degree in question must include a research component, either comprising coursework with research, or being solely thesis-based.

See also
 Bachelor of Commerce
 Master of Commerce

Notes

Business qualifications
Commerce
Commerce
Management education